This is a list of islands of British Columbia.

South Coast

Vancouver Island

Vancouver Island

Gulf of Georgia

Gulf Islands

Southern Gulf Islands

Brethour Island
Cabbage Island
Curlew Island
De Courcy Islands
Mudge Island
Link Island
Ruxton Island
Pylades Island
Gabriola Island
Galiano Island
Gossip Island
 SIS¶ENEM (Halibut Island)
Hudson Island
James Island

Leech Island
Mayne Island
Moresby Island
Parker Island
Penelakut (Formerly Kuper Island)
Pender Island (North and South)
Piers Island
Portland
Prevost Island
Reid Island
Russell Island
Saltspring Island
Samuel Island
Saturna Island

Secret Island
Secretary Islands
Sidney Island
Tent Island
Tree Island
Tumbo Island
Thetis Island
Valdes Island
Wallace Island
Whaleboat Island
Wise Island

Northern Gulf Islands

Ballenas Islands
Denman Island
Hornby Island

Harwood Island
Jedediah Island
Lasqueti Island

Sandy Island (aka Tree Island)
Savary Island
Texada Island

Discovery Islands
While included here, because of their location at the northern end of the Gulf of Georgia, Cortes and Quadra islands are often categorized as part of the Northern Gulf Islands.

Cortes Island
East Redonda Island
East Thurlow Island
Hernando Island

Maurelle Island
Quadra Island
Read Island
Rendezvous Islands

Sonora Island
Stuart Island
West Redonda Island
West Thurlow Island

Sunshine Coast
Edgecombe Island
Grant Island
Merry Island
Nelson Island
Thormanby Islands

Howe Sound

Anvil Island
Bowen Island

Bowyer Island
Defence Islands

Gambier Island
Keats Island

Pasley Island

West Coast of Vancouver Island

Barclay Sound
Broken Islands Group

Cape Scott
Cape Scott Islands
Lanz and Cox Islands

Nootka Sound
Bligh Island
Nootka Island

Kyuquot Sound
Union Island

Clayoquot Sound
Meares Island
Flores Island
Vargas Island
Solander Island

Lower Mainland
NB Most of the islands in this section are river or lake islands, not coastal islands. Deadman's Island is in Coal Harbour (Burrard Inlet), Echo and Long Islands are in Harrison Lake.  All others are in the Fraser River and its estuary.

Annacis Island
Barnston Island
Deadman's Island (Burrard Inlet)
Deas Island
Douglas Island
Crescent Island

Echo Island
Herrling Island
Iona Island
Long Island
Lulu Island
Matsqui Island

McMillan Island
Mitchell Island
Nicomen Island
Poplar Island
Sea Bird Island
Sea Island
Westham Island

Central Coast

Johnstone Strait-Queen Charlotte Strait region

Broughton Archipelago
Broughton Island
North Broughton Island
Eden Island
Bonwick Island
Baker Island
Cormorant Island (loc. of Alert Bay)
Hardwicke Island
Harbledown Island, site of New Vancouver
Malcolm Island (loc. of Sointula)

Turnour Island, site of Kalugwis (Karlukwees)
Village Island, site of Memkumlis (Mamalilikalla)
Hull Island
West Cracroft Island
East Cracroft Island
Klaoitsis Island
Kamano Island
Hanson Island
Minstrel Island
Gilford Island, site of Gwayasdums

Fitz Hugh Sound-Dean Channel region

Calvert Island
Campbell Island
Cunningham Island

Denny Island
Dufferin Island
King Island
Hecate Island

Hunter Island
Yeo Island

North Coast

Queen Charlotte Sound-Hecate Strait region

Aristazabal Island
Banks Island
Calvert Island
Campania Island
Dowager Island
Estevan Group

Gribbell Island
Gil Island
Hawkesbury Island
Kohl Island
Lady Douglas Island
McCauley Island
Pitt Island
Pooley Island

Porcher Island
Price Island
Princess Royal Island
Roderick Island
Sarah Island
Susan Island
Swindle Island

Dixon Entrance-Portland Channel region

Digby Island
Dundas Island
Kaien Island (site of Prince Rupert)

Pearse Island
 Somerville Island

Stephens Island
Wales Island

Haida Gwaii (Queen Charlotte Islands) 

Anthony Island
Burnaby Island
Chaatl Island
Frederick Island
Graham Island
Hibben Island

Hippa Island
Hotspring Island
Huxley Island
Kunghit Island
Langara Island
Louise Island

Lyell Island
Maude Island
Moresby Island
Ramsay Island
Talunkwan Island
Tanu Island

Interior

Grant Island, Lake Okanagan
Rattlesnake Island, Lake Okanagan
Copper Island, Shuswap Lake

Lady Franklin Rock, Fraser Canyon
Saddle Rock, Fraser Canyon
Zuckerberg Island, at the confluence of the Kootenay and Columbia Rivers

See also 
 British Columbia Coast

External links
 Geographical names, Canada

 
British Columbia
Islands